The Fort-12 (Ukrainian: Форт-12) is a semi-automatic pistol which was designed in the late 1990s by Ukrainian firearms designer RPC Fort.

History 
First "Fort-12" pistols were made in 1995, since April 1995 "Fort-12N" became an award of President of Ukraine

In December 1998 "Fort-12" was adopted as a sidearm for Ministry of Internal Affairs and until the end of 1998, the first 50 pistols were obtained by the Main Department of Internal Affairs of the city of Kyiv. Later it was adopted as a sidearm for "K" unit of Security Service of Ukraine and security guards.

In October 2011, it was proposed to equip "Fort-12" pistols with gun-mounted flashlight.

Variants

 Fort-12 (Форт-12) – first model, 9×18mm Makarov cartridge
 Fort-12-02 (Форт-12-02) – limited edition (chromium-plated Fort-12)
 Fort-12-03 (Форт-12-03) – limited edition (nickel-plated Fort-12)
 Fort-12B (Форт-12Б) – a suppressed version of the Fort-12 (with detachable suppressor)
 Fort-12 CURZ (Форт-12 CURZ) – second model, 9x17mm (.380 ACP) cartridge
 Fort-12N (Форт-12Н) – an award of President of Ukraine and state award of Ukraine (since 2000), manufactured in presentational grade (with silvered frame, gold inlays and engravings)
 Sokol (Сокол) – IPSC sport pistol with recoil compensator, 9×18mm Makarov cartridge.
 Fort-12G (Форт-12Г) – 9mm non-lethal gas pistol. The use of gas pistols in Ukraine is permitted to civil population
 Fort-12R (Форт-12Р) – 9mm non-lethal gas pistol with the ability to fire ammunition with rubber bullets. 9 mm P.A. cartridge 12 or 13 round box magazine.
 Fort-12RM (Форт-12РМ) – non-lethal gas pistol with the ability to fire ammunition with rubber bullets. 13 round box magazine. In production since 2011
 Fort-12T (Форт-12Т) – non-lethal gas pistol with the ability to fire ammunition with rubber bullets. 12 or 13 round box magazine
 Fort-12TM (Форт-12ТМ) – non-lethal gas pistol with the ability to fire ammunition with rubber bullets. 10 round box magazine

Accessories
 LT-6 (ЛТ-6) – gun-mounted flashlight which can be mounted below the barrel.
 LT-6A (ЛТ-6А) – gun-mounted flashlight which can be mounted below the barrel.
 Fort-4 (Форт-4) – detachable suppressor for Fort-12B
 standard duty holster for uniformed security personnel
 tactical holster for rapid response units of riot police ("Berkut")

Users

 : in April 2009 one Fort-12N pistol was given to S. S. Sidorsky

 : after "Orange Revolution" at least two Georgian officials (Mikheil Saakashvili and Vano Merabishvili) received Fort-12N pistols

 :
 Fort-12T, Fort-12TM, Fort-12R and Fort-12RM are allowed for private security guards

 : in March 2018 one Fort-12N pistol was given to Jaber Al-Mubarak Al-Hamad Al-Sabah

 : in September 2010 one Fort-12N pistol was given to Bronisław Komorowski

 :
 Fort-12 – at least, several pistols since Annexation of Crimea by the Russian Federation in 2014. In Crimea, Simferopol "Berkut" unit was armed with several Fort-12 pistols since October 1999
 Fort-12T – since 2008 were sold on civilian market as non-lethal self-defence weapon. Since 1 July 2011 import of non-lethal self-defence weapon is prohibited Since August 2014 Ukraine have banned the export of arms and military products to Russia (incl. magazines and other spare parts for previously sold Fort-12T pistols)

 :
 Fort-12 – сurrently, Fort 12 is issued to the National Police of Ukraine and security forces but is only supplementing Makarov PMs in service.
 Fort-12R – in 2000 Fort-12R was adopted as non-lethal self-defence weapon for customs service. In 2002 Ministry of Internal Affairs adopted Fort-12R as non-lethal self-defence weapon for militsiya. Later Fort-12R was adopted as non-lethal self-defence weapon for State Border Guard Service of Ukraine. Also, Fort-12R and Fort-12RM are allowed for private security guards

 : 
 in February 1998 one Fort-12N pistol was given to Islam Karimov
 an agreement was signed in October 2000 on the delivery of a batch of Fort-12 pistols to Uzbekistan

Gallery

References

Literature
 Макет масо-габаритного пістолета Форт-12: керівництво з експлуатації. – Вінниця: КНВО "Форт" МВС України, 2007. – 10 с.

External links

 M. R. Popenker. Fort 12 pistol (Ukraine) at the  Modern Firearms website

.380 ACP semi-automatic pistols
9×18mm Makarov semi-automatic pistols
Semi-automatic pistols of Ukraine
Weapons and ammunition introduced in 1998